European Parliament elections were held in France on 17 June 1984. Four parties were able to win seats: an alliance of the centre right Union for French Democracy and the Gaullist Rally for the Republic, the Socialist Party and the French Communist Party, and the Front National.  56.7% of the French population turned out on election day.

The result was the first time the far-right Front National obtained important results – this time 10.8% and close to the declining French Communist Party. Jonah Birch argues in Jacobin that the FN's rise in popularity was caused by the Socialists abandoning their Keynesian platform the previous year and instead pursuing policies of austerity.

Results

References

France
European Parliament elections in France
Europe